Vaishali Mahila College
is a constituent college of Babasaheb Bhimrao Ambedkar Bihar University. This government college is in Hajipur, Vaishali District.

Courses 

Only UG courses are available.

Infrastructure and facilities

Location
Hajipur, Vaishali. 
Distance from nearest famous places of Hajipur to the college.
  distance from Ramashish Chowk Bus Stand 
  (approximate) distance from Hajipur court, Gandhi Chowk, Kachahari Road, Hajipur

Railway distance
  distance from Hajipur railway station
  distance from Sonpur railway station.

Alumni
 Ritu Jaiswal - Mukhiya of Singhwahini Gram Panchayat, Sonbarsha, Sitamarhi, Bihar

References

Universities and colleges in Bihar
Education in Hajipur
Educational institutions in India with year of establishment missing